Joanne Weir's Cooking Class is a cooking show airing on PBS. Each episode features a novice student who is shown
how to prepare several related dishes. The program is presented by KQED, distributed by American Public Television and produced by A La Carte Communications.

Episodes

Season One
Risotto
Sauce Camp #1
Soufflés
Braising
Spain
Vegetarian
Roasted Lamb
Seafood
Sauce Camp #2
Dry Pasta
Cheese
Moroccan
Italian
Sauce For Skewers
Tuscan
Handmade Pasta
Soups
Pizza
Florentine Grilling
From The Pantry
Tarts
Beef Tenderloin Dinner
Italy's Piedmont
Baking
Salads
Beans

Season Two
Stuffed Chicken Breasts & Fava Fennel Salad
Pork Chops, Lemon Freeze & Citrus Crisps
Shellfish Orzo Stew & Orange, Avocado Salad
Sausage Crostini, Goat Cheese Linguine & Melons in Wine
Tomato Basil Fettuccine & Grilled Corn Salad
Summer Bean Pasta & Italian Bread Salad
Brick-Cooked Chicken & Grilled Potato Salad
Beef Roulade & Grilled Bread with Tomatoes
Wild Mushroom Lasagna & Grilled Pepper Salad
Spicy Sausage Penne & Harvest Flatbread
Asparagus Soup & Grilled Herbed Lamb Leg
Chicken Ragout & Stewed Grape Panna Cotta
Provençal Roasted Lamb & White Bean Salad
Spicy Crab Linguine & Winter White Salad
"Saintly" Penne & Fried Oyster Caesar
Asparagus Salad with Tangy Relish & Rolled Pork with Figs
Beet Gorgonzola Salad & Veal Chops
Asparagus Puffs (Gougères) and Lamb Skewers with Fava Salad
Cherry Tomato Pizza & Fennel Arugula Salad
Ricotta Mint Ravioli & Lemon Salad
Tomato & Mozzarella Farfalle & Crispy Cracker Bread
Grilled Sea Bass with Romesco & Summer Vegetables
Zucchini Blossom Risotto & Lemon-Shrimp Risotto
Salmon with Herb Sauce & Orange Olive Oil Cake
Veal Chops with Salad & Pineapple Sorbet
Golden Gazpacho & Chicken Breasts with Relish

References

External links
 Official web site

PBS original programming
2000s American cooking television series
2010s American cooking television series
2007 American television series debuts